Lieutenant General Edward Westby Donovan KLH (6 September 1821 – 1897) was Commander of British Troops in China, Hong Kong and the Straits Settlements.

Military career
Donovan was commissioned into the 33rd Regiment of Foot in 1840. He fought in the Crimean War and was severely wounded at the Siege of Sevastopol in 1855. For this he was made a Chevalier (Knight) of the Légion d'honneur.

In 1878 he was appointed Commander of British Troops in China, Hong Kong and the Straits Settlements, a post he held until 1882. He retired in 1887 with the honorary rank of full general.

Following, he was made Colonel of the East Yorkshire Regiment (1891—1897).

Family

Edward Westby Donovan belonged to the distinguished Ballymore sept of the O'Donovans of Clanloughlin.

References

1821 births
1897 deaths
Duke of Wellington's Regiment officers
British Army lieutenant generals
East Yorkshire Regiment officers
Edward
Chevaliers of the Légion d'honneur
Recipients of the Order of the Medjidie
British Army personnel of the Crimean War
33rd Regiment of Foot officers
Irish officers in the British Army